Prosperous, the adjectival form of Prosperity, may also refer to:

Places
 Prosperous, County Kildare, Ireland
 Battle of Prosperous (1798)
 Prosperous Bay Plain, Saint Helena

Political parties
 Prosperous Armenia
 Prosperous Indonesia Party
 Prosperous Justice Party (Indonesia)
 Prosperous Peace Party (Indonesia)
 Prosperous and Safe Aceh Party (Indonesia)

Other
 Prosperous (album), by Christy Moore
 Prosperous and Qualified, 1988 album by free jazz ensemble Universal Congress Of
 The Prosperous Few and the Restless Many, 1992 book compiling three interviews of Noam Chomsky by David Barsamian